Paul Hamilton may refer to:

 Paul Hamilton (politician) (1762–1816), United States Secretary of the Navy and governor of South Carolina
 USS Paul Hamilton (DDG-60), a 1993 Arleigh Burke-class destroyer in the United States Navy
 USS Paul Hamilton (DD-590), a Fletcher-class destroyer  in the United States Navy
 USS Paul Hamilton (DD-307), a Clemson-class destroyer in the United States Navy
 SS Paul Hamilton, a 1942 Liberty ship built in the United States during World War II
 Paul Hamilton (soccer) (born 1988), Canadian soccer player
 Paul Hamilton (footballer, born 1941) (1941–2017), Nigerian footballer and manager
 Paul Hamilton (Australian footballer) (born 1967), former Australian rules footballer 
 Paul Hamilton (American football) (born 1958), American football coach and former player
 Paul Hamilton (architect), British architect